Morné van der Merwe (28 March 1973 – 18 January 2013) was a South African rugby union player. His regular playing position was loosehead prop. He played for the Stormers in Super Rugby and the Eastern and Western Provinces in the Currie Cup. He also played for the Wellington Lions in New Zealand. Van der Merwe died on 18 January 2013 after a battle with brain cancer.

References

External links 
itsrugby.co.uk profile

1973 births
2013 deaths
Eastern Province Elephants players
South African rugby union players
Stormers players
Sharks (rugby union) players
Western Province (rugby union) players
Rugby union props
Wellington rugby union players